Blue Peter is a British children's television programme created by John Hunter Blair. It is the longest-running children's television programme in the world, and also one of the longest-running television programmes in the world.

Blue Peter currently airs weekly on Fridays in the United Kingdom on CBBC, a digital television channel. The show is produced in a magazine format, often transmitting live, and features a combination of studio presentation, interviews and outside broadcasting items. There have been forty-two official presenters of Blue Peter.

History
The first presenters of Blue Peter were Christopher Trace and Leila Williams. Trace presented for nearly nine years, and Williams for just over three years (although no footage of her has been retained by the BBC). In the early days, as the show ran continuously on a weekly basis, other presenters occasionally stepped in to give the regular team a break. Artist Tony Hart and actress Ann Taylor both presented the show either in place of either Trace or Williams, or sometimes in place of both, with Taylor replacing Williams for six weeks in 1959 and presenting the show at least once alone, as did Hart. When Williams was fired from the show in 1962 following a series of spats with a newly appointed producer, Trace continued to present the show alone or with one-off presenters until a replacement was found. The role went to Anita West, who presented sixteen editions over a four-month period in 1962—the shortest tenure of any full-time presenter—before abruptly resigning due to her imminent divorce, something she had not revealed to the producers. Her tenure was so short that no footage from her time on Blue Peter exists in the BBC Archives, although footage of her audition remains, along with that of Valerie Singleton and other auditioners. It was not until 1998 that West was officially recognised as a former presenter. 

John Noakes was the longest-serving presenter, having presented the show for over twelve years, and Konnie Huq is the longest-serving female presenter, with a tenure of over ten years, beating Valerie Singleton by three months. However, although Singleton left the series full-time in 1972 to present the spin-off series Blue Peter Special Assignment, she continued to be an occasional presenter until 1975. Singleton's last 'official' appearance on the show came on 20 October 1975 although she was also credited with appearing on the 1975 'review of the year' programme, broadcast on 29 December 1975. Singleton made the first of her many returns to the programme in January 1976 following the death of the first Blue Peter cat, Jason. She also returned to Blue Peter on 16 October 1978 to co-present the live UK TV balloon release for the 20th Anniversary. Singleton presented her last Special Assignment in May 1981, and returned to co-present Blue Peter to moderate the live UK TV link-up to launch the 25th Silver Anniversary balloon hunt on 17 October 1983; these additions make her total presenting span 21 years. Sandra Michaels presented the show twice in April 1964 in the absence of Singleton, and impressed producer Edward Barnes enough that he considered her as a replacement for Singleton; however, Michaels turned this down and he opted to carry on with Singleton, something he admitted in hindsight he was glad he did. The youngest presenter of Blue Peter was Yvette Fielding, who was eighteen when she began presenting, and the oldest was John Noakes, who was forty-four when he left. Only one presenter, Peter Duncan, had two stints of presenting, his first being from 1980 to 1984, and his second being from 1985 to 1986.

The only presenter to have been fired from Blue Peter mid-contract is Richard Bacon, who was dismissed from the show in 1998 after it emerged that he had taken cocaine. A number of other presenters have garnered negative publicity for aspects of their private lives, which has been described in some sections of the British media as the "curse of Blue Peter". Nevertheless, many of the show's former presenters have continued to work in the media. Indeed, Bacon's career survived his dismissal; he has since presented The Big Breakfast and Top of the Pops among numerous other radio and television shows, some of which were for the BBC.

After its move to Salford in September 2011, Blue Peter had a format with two permanent presenters, Helen Skelton and Barney Harwood, supplemented by guest presenters for particular topics, such as Naomi Wilkinson for wildlife.

On 4 March 2013, the BBC announced that it was searching for a new presenter to start in the summer of 2013. They announced that CBBC stars Dick and Dom would be hosting a new TV show to find the next presenter. The show began on 24 June as Blue Peter - You Decide! The judges were Myleene Klass, Eamonn Holmes and Cel Spellman. The winner was chosen after five weeks of competition, via a public vote. On 25 July 2013, it was announced that 22-year-old Lindsey Russell had won the public vote to become Blue Peters 36th presenter.

On 8 August 2013, Skelton announced on air that she was leaving the show in September after five years, to be replaced by Radzi Chinyanganya.

Harwood left the programme on 14 September 2017. Chinyanganya left after five-and-a-half years on 18 April 2019. On 26 April, Chinyanganya's replacement was announced as Richie Driss. It was announced on 13 May 2020 that Mwaksy Mudenda would join Russell and Driss, returning the show to a three-presenter format. On 1 September 2020, Adam Beales was announced as the show's 40th presenter.

On 24 June 2021, Russell announced she would be leaving the programme, with her last appearance on 15 July 2021. On 17 June 2022, Beales announced that he would be leaving, with his last appearance to be aired on 15 July 2022. Joel Mawhinney became the 41st presenter on 11 November 2022, following a recent stint of guest presenting during the summer.

On 3 February 2023, Driss announced that after 4 years he would leave the show, with his last show to be aired on 3 March.

Presenters

: Current Blue Peter presenters

Timeline of presenters

Notes

References

External links
 Blue Peter BBC
 
 Blue Peter Museum of Broadcast Communications
 The A–Z of Blue Peter The Independent, 12 March 2005

 
Blue Peter